Zieria cephalophila is a plant in the citrus family Rutaceae and is only found on a single, isolated mountain in Queensland. It is a compact shrub with wiry branches, warty, three-part leaves and one to three white flowers, each with four petals and four stamens, in leaf axils.

Description
The leaflets have a distinct, warty mid-vein on the lower surface and the edges of the leaf are rolled under.

Taxonomy and naming
Zieria cephalophila was first formally described in 2007 by Marco Duretto and Paul Forster from a specimen collected on a rocky mountain top known as Sydney Heads near Nebo in Queensland. The description was published in Austrobaileya. Duretto and Forster derived the specific epithet (cephalophila) "from the Greek cephalus (head) and philus (loving)", alluding to the populations of this plant occurring on Sydney Heads in the Homevale National Park, Queensland. In ancient Greek kephalē (κεφαλή) was used for "head". Cephalus is the Latinized version of Kephalos (Κέφαλος), first name of various Greek mythological and historical figures.

Distribution and habitat
This zieria grows in woodland and shrubland on rocky, volcanic outcrops in the Homevale National Park.

Conservation
Zieria cephalophila is listed as "Least concern" under the Queensland Nature Conservation Act 1992.

References

cephalophila
Sapindales of Australia
Flora of Queensland
Taxa named by Marco Duretto
Plants described in 2007
Taxa named by Paul Irwin Forster